Martín Carlos Alarcón, in Brazil often just Alarcón, born 25 December 1928 in Formosa, Argentina, was an association football player.

It is reported, that the short, skillful and very speedy attacker commenced his career in 1945 at the lowly Sportivo Patria in his hometown. Several years later the Paraguay national team coach Manuel Fleitas Solich helped him to get contracted with Libertad in the capital Asunción.

In 1951, he returned to Argentina to play for the top club River Plate in Buenos Aires, where he had little success competing with players like Angel Labruna, Felix Loustau and Walter Gomez for an attacker position. Thus, in 1952 he took the opportunity to play again for Libertad. After competing without much success in the Copa Rio of 1952 Libertad went on to become runner-up in the national championship. In 1953 Libertad  became again runner up in the championship, and players from the club made up the majority of the Paraguay national team that in the same year won for the first time the South American Championship.

In 1954, Martín Alarcón moved to Brazil, where he joined America-RJ in Rio de Janeiro, coached by Martim Francisco, who is credited with introducing the 4-2-4-system in Brazil. Alongside players like Canário, who would later transfer to Real Madrid, and Manoel Pereira – known as Leônidas da Selva, or "Jungle Leônidas", due to his "raw" skills and resemblance to Leônidas da Silva – , Alarcón was 1954 and 1955 Championship of Rio de Janeiro runner-up, on both occasions losing the title to Flamengo. In a best-of-three series for the 1955 title, America lost the first match to Flamengo 0–1 and won the second one 5–1. In the decisive match on 6 April 1956 at Maracanã Stadium, before almost 140,000 spectators, a record crowd for America, Alarcón had to leave the field early in the first half after a tackle by Flamengo defender Tomires. Substitutions were not allowed then and the balance of the match swung to Flamengo, coached by Fleitas Solich, who eventually won 4–1 thus attaining its third consecutive title.

Alarcón, who is sometimes considered the top player of this era of America, had two more good years with the club in 1956 and 1957, in the latter year scoring 14 goals in the Rio-Championship, his highest tally ever. However, America had to make do with the 5th and 6th places. From mid-1958 forward Alarcón only received little if any playing time. Eventually, early 1960, the year when America would win its seventh and hitherto last Rio-Championship, Alarcón left the club.

In January 1960 he joined Millonarios in the Colombian capital Bogotá. With the club he won under the legendary coach Gabriel Ochoa Uribe the championships on 1961 and 1962.

Career summary 
Clubs
 1945–??: Sportivo Patria, Formosa, Argentina
 19??–50: Club Libertad, Asunción, Paraguay
 1951: CA River Plate, Buenos Aires, Argentina
 1952–53: Club Libertad, Asunción, Paraguay
 1954–59: America FC, Rio de Janeiro, Brazil
 1960–62: CD Los Millonarios, Bogotá, Colombia

Honours
 Championship of Colombia: 1961, 1962.
 Runner-up of the Championship of Paraguay: 1952, 1953.
 Runner-up of the Championship of Rio de Janeiro: 1954, 1955.

References 
 Alarcon… jornada triste no Maracanã, Tardes de Pacaembu: o futebol sem as fronteiras do tempo, 19 March 2014.

Notes

1928 births
Argentine expatriate footballers
Argentine footballers
America Football Club (RJ) players
Club Atlético River Plate footballers
Club Libertad footballers
Millonarios F.C. players
Categoría Primera A players
Paraguayan Primera División players
Expatriate footballers in Brazil
Expatriate footballers in Colombia
Expatriate footballers in Paraguay
Argentine expatriate sportspeople in Brazil
Argentine expatriate sportspeople in Colombia
Argentine expatriate sportspeople in Paraguay
Living people
Association football forwards
People from Formosa, Argentina